The 1892 Sewanee Tigers football team represented the Sewanee Tigers of Sewanee: The University of the South in the 1892 college football season.  In their second season as a full-time squad, the Tigers posted a 5–1–1 record.

Schedule

References

Sewanee
Sewanee Tigers football seasons
Sewanee Tigers football